The Colombia men's national volleyball team represents Colombia in international volleyball competitions and friendly matches.

Results

Bolivarian Games
 2005 — 2nd place
 2005 — 3rd place

2005 Bolivarian Games
Head coach: Jose A. Rojas

2016 Ranking and Points 
 Earned 2 points in the 2016 Brazil Olympics. 
 Ranked 3rd in the Continental Qualification in 2016.

References
CSV
Senior Men's Volleyball Rankings

Volleyball
National men's volleyball teams
Men's sport in Colombia
Volleyball in Colombia